(Main list of acronyms)


 E – (s) East
 e- – (i) Used as a prefix before unabbreviated words, stands for technical words such as electronic or emergency.

E0–9
 E3 or E3 – many, including Electronic Entertainment Expo, see entry

EA
 EA – (i) Electronic Attack – Emotions Anonymous – Engagement Area – Electronic Arts – Enrolled Agent – Environmental Assessment  - Enterprise Architect – (s) Exaampere
 EABU – (i) Explain Acronyms Before Use
 EAC – (i) Echelons Above Corps
 EAFUS – (i) "Everything" Added to Food in the United States (FDA list)
 EAPC – (i) Euro-Atlantic Partnership Council
 EASA – (i) European Aviation Safety Agency
 EAST – (a) Experimental Advanced Superconducting Tokamak

EB
 EB - East Bridgewater
 EBCDIC – (a/i) Extended Binary Coded Decimal Interchange Code (pronounced "eb-see-dik") (cf. BCD)
 EBD – (i) Electronic Brake Distribution
 EBE – (i) Extraterrestrial Biological Entity
 EBO
 (i/a) Effects Based Operations
 Encyclopædia Britannica Online
 European Board of Ophthalmology
 EBSA – (i) Employee Benefits Security Administration
 EBT
 (i) Earnings Before Taxes
 Electronic Benefit Transfer
 EBW
 (i) Electron Beam Welding
 Exploding BridgeWire

EC
 EC
 (s) Ecuador (ISO 3166 digram; FIPS 10-4 country code)
 (i) Electronic Combat
 European Community (see EEC)
 (s) Exacoulomb
 EC2 – (i) Many, some as an alternative to EC2, e.g., Elastic Compute Cloud
 ECB
 (i) England (and Wales) Cricket Board
 European Central Bank
 ECBR – (i) European Coalition for Biomedical Research
 ECASS – (i) European Centre for Analysis in the Social Sciences 
 ECCM – (i) Electronic Counter-Counter-Measures
 ECFS – (i) Electronic Case Filing System
 ECG – (i) Electrocardiogram
 ECHO
 (a) Each Community Helps Others (EPA programme)
 Educational Concerns for Hunger Organization
 European Commission Host Organization
 European Commission Humanitarian aid Office
 (p) Exchange Clearing House
 Expanded Characteristic Option
 (a) Explanatory Coherence by Harmony Optimization
 ECHR 
 (i) European Convention on Human Rights
 (i) European Court of Human Rights
 ECJ – (i) European Court of Justice
 ECL – (i) Emitter Coupled Logic (electronics)
 ECM
 (i) Electronic Counter-Measures
 Enterprise Content Management
 ECommHR – (p) European Commission on Human Rights
 ECOWAS - (a) Economic Community of West African States
 ECS
 (i) Emergency Contact System
 Enhanced Chip Set (computing)
 EOSDIS Core System
 Extended Chip Set (computing)
 ECSC – (i) European Coal and Steel Community (distant ancestor of the EU)
 ECT – (i) ElectroConvulsive Therapy
 ECtHR – (p) European Court of Human Rights
 ECU
 (s) Ecuador (ISO 3166 trigram)
 (i) European Currency Unit (ancestor of the euro)
 ECW
 (i) Eastern Championship Wrestling/Extreme Championship Wrestling

ED
 EDA – (i) European Defence Agency
 EDAC – (a) Error Detection And Correction
 EDC - (a) Everyday carry
 EDC-DAAC – (i) EROS Data Center Distributed Active Archive Center
 EDCS – (i) Environmental Data Coding Specification
 EDD
 (i) Earliest due date
 Electron-detachment dissociation
 Elena Delle Donne (American basketball player)
 Employment Development Department (California state agency)
 End-diastolic dimension
 Expected Date of Delivery (pregnancy)
 EDECSIM – (p) Extended Directed Energy Combat Simulation
 EDF or EdF – (i) Électricité de France (French, "France Electric Utility")
 EDGAR – (a) Electronic Data Gathering, Analysis, and Retrieval (U.S. Securities and Exchange Commission filings database)
 EDH – (i) Eastman Dental Hospital
 EDS
 (i) Electronic Data Systems
 Electronic Differential System
 EDSA – (a) Epifanio de los Santos Avenue (a major thoroughfare in Manila with great significance to post-1980 Philippines history)
 EDT – (i) Eastern Daylight Saving Time (UTC−4 hours)
 EDTA
 (i) Electric Drive Transportation Association
 (p) EthyleneDiamineTetraAcetic acid

EE
 ee – (s) Ewe language (ISO 639-1 code)
 EE
 (s) Estonia (ISO 3166 digram; from the country's native name of Eesti)
 (i) Electrical engineering
 Electrical Engineer
 E&E – (i) Escape and Evasion (training)
 EEC – (i) European Economic Community (predecessor of the EU)
 EEG – (i) ElectroEncephaloGram
 EEK – (s) Estonian kroon (ISO 4217 currency code)
 EENT – (i) End Evening Nautical Twilight
 EEO  – (i) Equal Employment Opportunity
 EEOC  – (i) (U.S.) Equal Employment Opportunity Commission
 EEZ – (i) Economic Exclusion Zone or Exclusive Economic Zone

EF
 EF
 (i) Electro-focus (Canon lens mount)
 Entry Foyer
 (s) Exafarad
 EFF – (i) Electronic Frontier Foundation
 EFL – English as a Foreign Language
 EFM – (i) Enterprise Feedback Management
 EFOA – (i) European Fuel Oxygenates Association
 EFSA – (i) European Food Safety Authority
 EFT – (i) Electronic Fund Transfer
 EFTA
 (i) European Free Trade Area
 (i) European Free Trade Association
 EFV – (i) Expeditionary Fighting Vehicle

EG
 e.g. – (i) exempli gratia (Latin, roughly "for the sake of an example", "for example", "for instance")
 EG – (s) Egypt (ISO 3166 digram; FIPS 10-4 country code)
 EGBUS – (i) External Genitalia, Bartholin's glands, Urethra & Skene's glands
 EGCG – (p) EpiGalloCatechin-3-Gallate
 EGIS – (a) Erieye Ground Interface Segment
 EGP – (s) Egyptian pound (ISO 4217 currency code)
 EGRET – (a) Energetic Gamma-Ray Experiment Telescope
 EGY – (s) Egypt (ISO 3166 trigram)

EH
 EH – (s) Exahenry – Western Sahara (ISO 3166 digram)
 EHA
 (p) Education for All Handicapped Children Act (U.S. federal legislation; since superseded by the Individuals with Disabilities Education Act)
 (i) Emotional Health Anonymous
 EHF – (i) Extremely High Frequency
 EHR – (i) Equipment History Record

EI
 Ei – (s) Exbi
 EI – (s) Ireland (FIPS 10-4 country code; from Éire)
 EIA – (i) Environmental Impact Assessment
 EIAH – Environnements Informatiques pour l'Apprentissage Humain
 EIAH – Encyclopedia of Iranian Architectural History
 EIC – East India Company
 EICS – East India Company's Service
 eID – electronic ID
 EIRP – (i) Effective Isotropic Radiated Power
 EIS – (i) Environmental Impact Statement

EJ
 EJ – (s) Exajoule

EK
 EK – (s) Equatorial Guinea (FIPS 10-4 country code) – Exakelvin
 EKG – (i) Electrocardiogram (from German Elektrokardiogramm)
 EKMS – (i) Electronic Key Management System

EL
 el – (s) Greek language (ISO 639-1 code)
 EL – (s) Exalitre
 ELF
 (a/i) Earth Liberation Front
 Endangered Language Fund
 Eritrean Liberation Front
 Executable and Linkable Format
 Extremely Low Frequency
 ELINT – (p) Electronic Intelligence
 ell – (s) Greek language (ISO 639-2 code)
 ELL – (i) English Language Learner
 ELM – (i) Edge-Localised Mode (plasma physics)
 ELO – (i) Electric Light Orchestra
 ELP
 (i) Emerson, Lake & Palmer
 European Left Party
 ELSS – (i) Emergency Life Support Stores
 ELT – (i) Emergency Locator Transmitter

EM
 Em – (s) Exametre
 EM – (i) ElectroMagnetism/ElectroMagnetic
 EMA – (i/a) European Medicines Agency
 Embraer – (p) Empresa Brasileira de Aeronáutica (Portuguese, "Brazilian Aeronautics Company")
 EMC
 (i) Electric Membership Corporation
 Electromagnetic Compatibility
 Electro-Motive Corporation
 European Muon Collaboration
 Evergreen Marine Corporation
 EMCON – (p) (Electromagnetic) Emissions Control
 EMD
 (i) General Motors Electro-Motive Division
 Engineering and Manufacturing Development
 European Missile Defence
 EMDEX – (a) Essential Medicines InDEX
 EMDG – (i) Euro-Missile Dynamics Group
 EMDR – (i) Eye Movement Desensitisation and Reprocessing 
 EMEA – (i) Europe, Middle East and Africa
 EMF
 (i) Electromotive force
 Epsom Mad Funkers (1990s–2000s indie dance band)
 EMG – (p) ElectroMyoGraph
 EMO – (i) Emergency Measures Organisation- (p) Emotional
 EMP – (i) ElectroMagnetic Pulse
 EMS – (i) Emergency Medical Services
 EMT – (i) Emergency Medical Technician
 EMU – (i) Electric Multiple Unit – a method of connecting self-propelled railway vehicles together to form a train under the control of one driver.
 EMV – (i) Europay, MasterCard, Visa (the companies that developed the current technical standard for chipped payment cards and contactless cards)

EN
 en – (s) English language (ISO 639-1 code)
 EN
 (p) Corps of Engineers
 (s) Estonia (FIPS 10-4 country code)
 Exanewton
 ENCODE – (p) Encyclopedia of DNA Elements (human genome data project)
 ENE – (i) East North-East
 eng – (s) English language (ISO 639-2 code)
 ENG – (s) England (FIFA trigram; not eligible for an ISO 3166 or IOC trigram)
 ENSATT – (i) École nationale supérieure des arts et techniques de théâtre (French, "Higher National School of Theatrical Arts and Techniques")
 ENT – (i) Ear, Nose and Throat
 ENTEC – (a) Euro NATO Training Engineer Centre
 ENVL – (a) Envelope
 ENY – (p) Enemy

EO
 eo – (s) Esperanto language (ISO 639-1 code)
 EO
 (i) Electro-Optics
 Engagement Operations
 EOD – (i) Explosive Ordnance Disposal
 E&OE – (i) Errors and Omissions Excepted
 EOG – (i) ElectroOculoGraphy
 EOS
 (i) Earth Observation Satellite
 (a/i) Electro-Optical System, Canon's autofocusing system for film and digital SLR cameras
 (i) Electrophoresis Operations in Space, a space manufacturing project of the McDonnell Douglas Astronautics Company
 EOSAT – (p) Earth Observation Satellite
 EOSDIS – (a/i) Earth Observation Satellite Data and Information System
 EOTS
 (i) Electro-Optical Tactical Sensor
 (a/i) Eye Of The Storm (World of Warcraft)
 EOM – (i) End of Message

EP
 EP – (i) European Parliament
 EP – (i) Extended play
 EPA
 (p) EicosaPentaenoic Acid
 (i) Environmental Protection Agency
 EPCOT – (a) Experimental Prototype Community Of Tomorrow
 EPCR
 (i) Endothelial protein C receptor
 European Professional Club Rugby
 EPFL – (i) École polytechnique fédérale de Lausanne (French, "Lausanne Federal Institute of Technology")
 EPGS – (i) EOS Polar Ground Sites
 EPIRB – (a/i) Emergency Position Indicating Radio Beacon
 EPL – (i) English Premier League
 EPLRS – (a) Enhanced Position Location Reporting System ("ee-plarz")
 epo – (s) Esperanto language (ISO 639-2 code)
 EPO
 (i) Ellinikí Podosferikí Omospondía (Greek Ελληνική Ποδοσφαιρική Ομοσπονδία, translated as "Hellenic Football Federation")
 European Patent Organisation or its main organ, the European Patent Office
 (p) Erythropoietin
 EPOS – (a) Electronic Point Of Sale
 EPPA – (i) Employee Polygraph Protection Act
 EPR – (i) European Pressurised [Nuclear] Reactor
Evaporator Pressure regulator
 EPW
 (i) Earth Penetrator Weapon/Warhead
 Economic and Political Weekly (Indian publication)
 Enemy Prisoner of War

EQ
 EQ – (i) Emotional Quotient
 EQG – (s) Equatorial Guinea (FIFA trigram, but not IOC or ISO 3166)

ER
 Er – (s) Erbium
 ER
 (i) Emergency Room
 (s) Eritrea (ISO 3166 digram; FIPS 10-4 country code)
 ERA
 (i) Earned run average
 Engineering Research Associates
 Equal Rights Amendment
 English Racing Automobiles
 European Railway Agency
 ERCIM – (a/i) European Research Consortium for Informatics and Mathematics
 ERI – (s) Eritrea (ISO 3166 trigram)
 ERLAWS – (a) Eastern Ruapehu Lahar Alarm and Warning System
 ERN – (s) Eritrean nakfa (ISO 4217 currency code)
 EROS – (a) Earth Resources Observation System
 ERP – (i) Engineer Regulating Point
 ERR – (p) Eesti Rahvusringhääling
 ERS – (i) Earth Resources Survey
 ERTS – (i) Earth Resources Technology Satellite (became Landsat)
 ERV – (p) Endogenous RetroVirus

ES
 es – (s) Spanish language (ISO 639-1 code)
 Es
 (s) Einsteinium
 Exasecond
 ES
 (s) El Salvador (FIPS 10-4 country code)
 (i) Electronic warfare Support
 (s) Exasiemens
 Spain (ISO 3166 digram; from the country's native name of España)
 ESA
 (i) Electro-Spark Alloying
 Endangered Species Act
 European Space Agency
 ESC
 (i) Embryonic Stem Cell
 Electronic Stability Control
 ESD – (i) ElectroStatic Discharge
 ESDP – (i) European Security and Defence Policy
 ESE – (i) East South-East
 ESH – (s) Western Sahara (ISO 3166 trigram)
 ESL – (i) English as a Second Language
 ESM – (i) Electronic warfare Support Measures
 ESO – (i) European Southern Observatory
 ESOL – (a) English for Speakers of Other Languages
 ESP
 (i) Electronic Stability Program
 Extra-sensory perception
 (s) Spain (ISO 3166 trigram)
 ESPGHAN - European Society for Paediatric Gastroenterology, Hepatology and Nutrition
 ESPN – (i) Entertainment and Sports Programming Network
 est – (s) Estonian language (ISO 639-2 code)
 EST
 (i) Eastern Standard Time (UTC−5 hours)
 (s) Estonia (ISO 3166 trigram)
 ESU – (i) Emergency Services Unit
 ESV – (i) Engineer Support Vehicle

ET
 et – (s) Estonian language (ISO 639-1 code)
 ET
 (s) Ethiopia (ISO 3166 digram; FIPS 10-4 country code)
 Exatesla
 (i) Extra Terrestrial
 ETA
 (i) Estimated Time of Arrival
 (a) Euzkadi Ta Azkatasuna ("etta", Basque, "Basque Homeland and Freedom")
 et al. – (p) et alii/aliae/alia (Latin, "and others")
 ETB – (s) Ethiopian Birr (ISO 4217 currency code)
 ETC/RMT – (i) Explosive Transient Camera/Rapidly Moving Telescope
 Etc. - Et cetera
 ETF – (i) Emergency Task Force (a special police unit, also jocularly said to stand for Extra-Thick Fuzz)
 ETH – (s) Ethiopia (ISO 3166 trigram)
 ETI – (i) Extra-Terrestrial Intelligence
 ETK
 (i) Easy Tool Kit
 (i) Embedded Tool Kit
 Ersatzteikatalog (German: spare parts catalog)
 ETLA – (i) Extended TLA
 ETM
 (i) Electronic Technical Manual
 (i) Enhanced Thematic Mapper
 ETOPS - (a) Extended-range Twin-engine Operational Performance Standards (aviation)
 et seq. – (p) et sequens/sequentes/sequentia (Latin, "and the following one(s)")
 ETT – (i) Embedded Training Team

EU
 eu – (s) Basque language (ISO 639-1 code)
 Eu – (s) Europium
 EU
 (s) Europa Island (FIPS 10-4 country code)
 (i) European Union
 EUCOM – (p) (U.S.) European Command
 EULA – (a) End-User License Agreement ("you-lah")
 EUR – (s) euro (ISO 4217 currency code)
 eus – (s) Basque language (ISO 639-2 code)
 EUUSA – (s) European Union and United States of America

EV
 EV – (s) Exavolt
 EVA
 (i) Earned Value Analysis
 Economic value added
 Ethylene-Vinyl Acetate
 Extra-Vehicular Activity
 EVIL – (a) Electronic viewfinder (with) interchangeable lens (a type of digital camera)

EW
 EW – (i) Electronic Warfare – (s) Exawatt
 ewe – (s) Ewe language (ISO 639-2 code)
 EWR – (s) Newark Liberty International Airport (IATA airport code)
 EWSD – (p) Elektronisches Wählsystem Digital (German, "Electronic Digital Switching System")
 EWTN – (i) Eternal Word Television Network

EX
 EXFOR – (p) Experimental Force (military)
 EXREP – (p) Expeditious Repair (SM&R code)

EY
 EYD
 Ejaan Yang Disempurnakan (Indonesian, "Perfected Spelling System", used officially in Indonesia since 1972)
 Eurovision Young Dancers

EZ
 EZ – (s) Czech Republic (FIPS 10-4 country code) – (i) Extraction Zone
 EZLN – (a) Ejército Zapatista de Liberación Nacional (Spanish, "Zapatista Army of National Liberation")

References

Acronyms E